Wockhardt is a global pharmaceutical and biotechnology company headquartered in Mumbai, India. It produces formulations, biopharmaceuticals, nutrition products, vaccines and active pharmaceutical ingredients (APIs). The company has manufacturing plants in India, UK, Ireland, France and US, and subsidiaries in US, UK, Ireland and France.

History
Wockhardt was founded by Dr. Habil Khorakiwala in the 1960s. His father Fakhruddin T. Khorakiwala had acquired Worli Chemical Works in 1959. This was incorporated as Wockhardt Pvt. Ltd., in 1973. Wockhardt Ltd. was incorporated on 8 July 1999. In the 1990s, Wockhardt gained market share with its painkiller Proxyvon (opioid tramadol + paracetamol) and blood pressure drugs (lisinopril, etc.). In 1995, it expanded into biotechnology, and subsequently started producing intravenous fluids.

Wockhardt is the first company outside the US and Europe to manufacture recombinant human insulin.

In 2011, Wockhardt sold its nutrition business to Danone for $356 million.

During the COVID-19 pandemic, Wockhardt signed a contract with the Government of the United Kingdom to fill-finish the Oxford–AstraZeneca COVID-19 vaccine at the company's facility in Wrexham, Wales. The contract was extended until August 2022. 

In August 2021, Wockhardt announced that it signed an agreement with Dubai-based Enso Healthcare and Russian firm Human Vaccine LLC to contract manufacture the Sputnik V and Sputnik Light vaccines in India.

Mergers and acquisitions
Wockhardt's acquisitions include Wallis Laboratory, UK (1998); Merind, India (1998); CP Pharmaceuticals, UK (2003); Espharma GmbH, Germany (2004); Dumex, India (2006); Pinewood Laboratory Ireland (2006); Morton Grove Pharmaceuticals, US (2007); and Negma, France (2007). Wockhardt's debt following the acquisitions was close to Rs 38 billion, and Habil Khorakiwala quit as managing director.

The board of directors, on 31 March 2009 approved the appointments of Habil Khorakiwala's sons Murtaza Khorakiwala and Huzaifa Khorakiwala as managing director and executive director respectively.

Philanthropy and education

 Wockhardt Foundation
 Wockhardt Global Schools

In popular culture

Wockhardt is known for producing cough syrup with the sedative promethazine and the opiate codeine, used in the recreational street drug lean, which is sometimes referred to as "Wock", short for Wockhardt. It is referenced by rapper Lil Yachty on his song Poland, where he sings "I took the Wock to Poland".

See also
 Wockhardt Hospitals
 Monginis

References

External links
 Official website
 Wockhardt Global School

Pharmaceutical companies of India
Manufacturing companies based in Mumbai
Companies listed on the Bombay Stock Exchange
Companies listed on the National Stock Exchange of India
1960 establishments in Maharashtra
Indian companies established in 1960
Pharmaceutical companies established in 1960